Governor Elphinstone may refer to:

John Elphinstone, 13th Lord Elphinstone (1807–1860), Governor of Madras from 1837 to 1842 and Governor of Bombay form 1853 to 1860
Mountstuart Elphinstone (1779–1859), Governor of Bombay from 1819 to 1827